New Berlin Eisenhower Middle/High School is a combination middle school and high school located in New Berlin, Wisconsin, United States. Part of the School District of New Berlin, the school serves grades 7 through 12. The school was nationally recognized as a Blue Ribbon School in 2005.

Locals refer to the school as "Ike".

History
Eisenhower opened in September 1969, although construction of the building was not complete until the spring of 1970. The school opened with 400 9th and 10th grade students from New Berlin West.

On Thursday, April 29, 1999 approximately 800 students from Eisenhower High School and Eisenhower Middle School staged a walkout, protesting the New Berlin Public School Board's $1.6 billion proposed budget cuts. The cuts included eliminating elective course options such as home economics and eliminating several teaching positions. Although students skipped class for the walkout from 9:30 am until early in the afternoon, many Eisenhower teachers supported the protest, and administration did not punish students for truancy.

Athletics
Eisenhower High School was a member of the Parkland Conference from 1970 to 1997. It has been a member of the Woodland Conference since 1997. The school has a cross-town rivalry with the city's other middle/high school, New Berlin West. In 1995, Eisenhower won its first state championship in any sport by defeating Ashland in the Division 3 State Football Championship game. The school successfully defended its championship in 1996, by defeating Spooner for the state title.

The boys' basketball team won the Division 2 state championship on March 8, 2008 with a 54-41 win over Adams-Friendship High School. The girls' softball team also won the Division 2 State Championship in 2008. The girls' basketball team won the Division 2 State Title in 2010. The Eisenhower girls returned to state in 2012 undefeated ranked second in the state into the championship game at 27-0, but fell short to #1 and undefeated New London 39-43. The girls also made it to the state championship in 2013, before losing to Notre Dame 33-42.

In 2008 the varsity boys' basketball team and the varsity girls' volleyball team won the state championships.

State championships
 1988 - Cheerleading
 1993 - Cheerleading
 1994 - Cheerleading
 1995 - Football
 1996 - Football
 1997 - Cheerleading
 1998 - Cheerleading
 1999 - Cheerleading
 2001 - Academic Decathlon
 2002 - Academic Decathlon
 2003 - Cheerleading
 2004 - Academic Decathlon
 2005 - Cheerleading
 2006 - Academic Decathlon
 2007 - Cheerleading
 2008 - Boys' basketball
 2008 - Girls' softball
 2009 - Academic Decathlon
 2009 - Boys' volleyball
 2010 - Academic Decathlon
 2010 - Girls' basketball
 2010 - Table tennis
 2011 - Academic Decathlon
 2011 - Cheerleading
 2012 - Academic Decathlon
 2013 - Academic Decathlon
 2013 - Cheerleading
 2016 - Girls' basketball
 2016 - Science Bowl
 2017 - Dance (Pom)
 2020 - Science Bowl
 2020 - Dance (Pom)
 2020 - Dance (Jazz)
 2021 - Lake Sturgeon Bowl
 2021 - Dance (Pom)
 2021 - Dance (Jazz)
 2022 - Dance (Pom)
 2022 - Dance (Jazz)

National championships
 2013 - Academic Decathlon
 2016 - Science Bowl

Notable alumni
Mike Hart (left-handed hitter), former professional baseball player.

Alex McRae, professional baseball player

References

External links
New Berlin Eisenhower Middle/High School website
New Berlin Eisenhower athletics and activities website
New Berlin Eisenhower girls' basketball website

Public high schools in Wisconsin
Schools in Waukesha County, Wisconsin
Educational institutions established in 1969
Public middle schools in Wisconsin
1969 establishments in Wisconsin